Hanne Sletner (born 27 August 1972) is a retired Norwegian ski-orienteering competitor.

At the 1998 World Ski Orienteering Championships in Windischgarsten she won a bronze medal with the Norwegian relay team, which consisted of herself, Valborg Madslien and Hilde Gjermundshaug Pedersen, and she finished 8th in the short and 13th in the classic course.

References

Norwegian orienteers
Female orienteers
Ski-orienteers
1972 births
Living people
20th-century Norwegian women